I'll Sleep When I'm Dead is a 2016 American documentary film about DJ and producer Steve Aoki. It debuted at the Tribeca Film Festival and was released on Netflix on August 19, 2016. It received a Grammy nomination for Best Music Film in 2016.

Background 
It was directed by Justin Krook and was produced by David Gelb, Matthew Weaver, Happy Walters and Matt Colon. Production of the documentary started in 2014, during the time when Aoki's Neon Future album was released. A Facebook Live interview with Aoki was conducted by Katie Couric in support of the release of the documentary on August 24, 2016. Aoki told Krook, "I’m letting you take a picture of me naked and showing the world."

Premise 
The documentary shows the life of Steve Aoki as a DJ and producer, and as a family man at home in Japan. Aoki's relationship with his father, owner of the restaurant chain Benihana, was also shown. Interviews with family members, and DJs and musical artists such as Diplo, Tiësto and will.i.am took place. We Got This Covered described the film as "a fine look into the life of Steve Aoki, exposing both the positives and negatives in his life that have led to mainstage superstardom" and gave it a 3/5 review.

Cast 
Credits adapted from IMDb; sorted in alphabetical order and all roles of the cast are by themselves.
 Afrojack
 Benji Madden
 Devon Aoki
 Diplo
 DJ AM
 Eric Garcetti
 Joel Madden
 Kid Ink
 Laidback Luke
 Matt Colton
 Mike Mowery
 Pete Tong
 Rocky Aoki
 Steve Aoki
 Tiësto
 Travis Barker
 Will.i.am

References

External links 
 

2016 films
2016 documentary films
American documentary films
Netflix original documentary films
2010s English-language films
2010s American films